Westbury plc was a British housebuilding company based in Cheltenham, Gloucestershire. It was listed on the London Stock Exchange and was a constituent of the FTSE 250 Index but was acquired by Persimmon plc in 2005.

History
Westbury was established by the Joiner family in Gloucestershire in 1964.  Westbury remained a very small operation until 1971 when Geoff Hester was recruited to run the business: from then on Westbury was managed by professional housebuilders from outside the Joiner family. After the 1974 housing recession, there was a period of regional expansion and by the early 1980s there were three regions, Gloucester, Bristol and south Wales, building around 1500 units a year between them. By now, the Joiner family wanted to realise their equity in the Company and it was floated on the Stock Exchange in 1986. This was almost immediately followed by the acquisition of the midlands division of Whelmar and the opening of a southern region.

Although Westbury lost money for three years in the 1990 housing recession, it had maintained its volumes. By the mid-1990s, the expansion programme resumed and a series of substantial acquisitions were made. Clarke Homes was bought from BICC in 1995; the Manchester-based Maunders in 1998; and the southern Prowting in 2002. At the same time, Westbury moved into prefabricated housing with the construction of a factory capable of producing 5,000 units a year, and diversified into financial services: both ventures lost money.

In November 2005, Westbury received a £643 million takeover approach from Persimmon plc, a larger British housebuilding company, which was accepted by the shareholders.

References

Housebuilding companies of the United Kingdom
Construction and civil engineering companies of England
Companies based in Cheltenham
Construction and civil engineering companies established in 1965
1965 establishments in England
British companies established in 1965